The Aravis is a mountain range in Savoie and Haute-Savoie, eastern France. It is part of the French Prealps, a lower chain of mountain ranges west of the main chain of the Alps. Its highest summit is the Pointe Percée, at 2753m. The orientation of the Aravis is north-south, and it stretches from Cluses in the north, to Ugine in the south. The Bornes massif, sometimes considered part of the Aravis, lies to its west. The Aravis is separated from the Chablais mountains in the north-east by the Arve river valley, and from the Graian Alps in the south-east by the Arly river valley.

Peaks 
Pointe Percée, 
Grande Balmaz, 
Roualle, 
Parrossaz, 
Mont Charvet, 
Roche Perfia, 
Aiguille de Borderan, 
Étale (mountain), 
Pointe d'Areu, 
Mont Charvin,

References
 

Mountain ranges of the Alps
Mountain ranges of Auvergne-Rhône-Alpes
Mountains of Haute-Savoie
Mountains of Savoie